The Felix-Rexhausen Award were created 1998 by the Bund Lesbischer und Schwuler JournalistInnen (the German affiliate of NLGJA – the National Lesbian and Gay Journalists Association) to recognize and honor the mainstream media for their fair, accurate and inclusive representations of the LGBT community and the issues that affect their lives.

The Felix-Rexhausen Award is presented annually. It is named in memory of Felix Rexhausen, a German, gay writer. It is presented to an individual who has made a significant difference in promoting equal rights for the LGBT community.

Winners 
2014 Monika Mengel: radio feature "'Und wir nehmen uns unser Recht' – 40 Jahre neue Lesbenbewegung" (WDR5, 14 January 2014)
Special award for Thomas Pfaff: radio feature "19. September 1963: Sendung der WDR-Glosse 'Mit Bayern leben' von Felix Rexhausen" (Zeitzeichen, WDR5, 19 September 2013)

2013 Claus Bredenbrock: TV documentary "Des Kaisers schmutzige Wäsche" (ZDF/Arte 2013)
Special award for Stefanie Fetz and Max Muth: article "Die Geisterspiele" (Franz Josef – Magazin der deutschen Journalistenschule, September 2012)

2012 Jobst Knigge: TV documentary "Der Aids-Krieg" (Das Erste, 16. November 2012)
Special award for TV programme "Ich bin schwul – Tobi steht auf Jungs" (Neuneinhalb – Das Check-Eins-Nachrichtenmagazin, 15 October 2011, Das Erste)

2011 Steffi Illinger: TV documentary "Traditionsbewusst, heimatverbunden, schwul – Eine ganz normale bayerische Volkstanzgruppe" (Bayerisches Fernsehen, Vor Ort – Die Reportage2, 5 October 2010)

2010 Günter Frorath, Michael Lohse and Roger Willemsen: radio programme "Er sucht ihn – Männerliebe literarisch" (Radio WDR5, SpielArt, 14 February 2010)
Special award for Sarah Stricker; article "Die wollen mich fertigmachen" (Frankfurter Allgemeine Sonntagszeitung: 30 August 2009)

2009 Christine Schön: radio feature "Nachhall – Junge Lesben suchen nach ihrer Geschichte"
(SWR 2: 15 April 2009)
and Frank Stocker: article "Wenn Liebe nur finanzielle Nachteile bringt"
(Welt am Sonntag: 22 February 2009)
Special award for Andreas Völlinger: articles "Schwule Hasen und echte Mädels" and "Voll schwule Superhelden" (Comicgate.de)

2008
Aljoscha Pause: TV documentary "Das große Tabu – Homosexualität und Fußball"
(DSF)

2007
Ted Anspach: TV documentary "Homosexualität – genetisch bedingt?"
(arte)
Special award for Kerstin Kilanowski: radio feature "Tanz auf der Grenze – Was ist Mann, was ist Frau?" (WDR 3)

2006
Martin Reichert: article "Adieu Habibi"
(taz: 29 July 2006)

2005
Hatice Ayten: TV documentary "Out of Istanbul"
(arte: 30 August 2005)

2004
Lorenz Wagner: article "Goldrausch in Gelsenkirchen"
(Financial Times Deutschland: 28 May 2004)

2003
Valentin Thurn: TV movie "Mein Papa liebt einen Mann"
(Film series "37 Grad" on German TV channel ZDF: 22 July 2003)

2002
Rosvita Krausz: radio feature "Leb wohl mein Herzensschöner – Nachruf auf eine schwule Liebe"
(Sender Freies Berlin: 28 April 2002)

2001
Martina Keller: radio feature "Ich liebe dich, Daddy!" about homosexuality in Namibia
(Deutschlandfunk: 30 January 2001)

2000
Die Lesbisch-Schwule Presseschau: institutional for great engagement

1999
Karin Jurschik: article "Es gibt nichts, worüber wir nicht reden könnten"
(Cologne monthly magazine "StadtRevue")
and Detlef Grumbach: radio feature "Bürger wider Willen – die Schwulen-Bewegung zwischen Revolte und Integration"
(Deutschlandfunk)

1998
Thomas Rombach and Jürgen Kolb: radio feature "Der süddeutsche Sängerkrieg oder Heidelberger Rosa Kehlchen versus Badischer Sängerbund"
(radio magazine "Radio Sub" on station Radio X in Frankfurt, Germany)

External links 
 JournalistInnen-Preis des BLSJ: Felix-Rexhausen-Award with more information
 Official Homepage of Bund Lesbischer und Schwuler JournalistInnen e.V. (BLSJ)

German journalism awards
LGBT-related awards
German television awards

de:Bund Lesbischer und Schwuler JournalistInnen#Felix-Rexhausen-Preis